John Dodd may refer to:

John Dodd (bow maker) (1752–1839), English bow-maker
John Dodd (jockey) (1863–1881), Australian jockey killed in the 1881 Melbourne Cup
John Dodd (Reading MP) (1717–1782), English Member of Parliament for Reading, 1741, and 1755–1782
John Dodd (rugby union) (born 1985), New Zealand rugby union player
John Dodd (tea merchant), English merchant and author on Formosa, pioneer of Taiwan's tea industry
John Dodd (Wells MP) (c. 1693–1719), English Member of Parliament for Wells, 1717–1719
John Newton Dodd, New Zealand physicist
John Samuel Dodd (1904–1973), British Member of Parliament for Oldham, 1935–1945
Johnny Dodd (1941–1991), American lighting designer
Johnny Dodd (rugby league), rugby league footballer of the 1950s for New Zealand, and Wellington

See also
John Dodds (disambiguation)
John Dods (born 1948), special effects make-up artist